Haruhiko Tsuchiya from the University of Yamanashi, Kofu, Yamanashi, Japan was named Fellow of the Institute of Electrical and Electronics Engineers (IEEE) in 2013 for contributions to single-mode optical fiber transmission.

References

Fellow Members of the IEEE
Living people
Year of birth missing (living people)
Place of birth missing (living people)